Canal de San Juan is a station along Line A of the Mexico City Metro. It is located in the  Iztacalco municipality. In 2019, the station had an average ridership of 13,188 passengers per day.

Name and pictogram

The station is located on the intersection of Calzada Ignacio Zaragoza and Canal de San Juan. Before it was dried and turned into a thoroughfare, as many other canals and rivers in Mexico City, the Canal de San Juan (San Juan Channel) connected Texcoco and Xochimilco.

Because of this, the pictogram for the station depicts the bow of an Aztec canoe travelling through a canal, commonly associated to the way the Aztecs used to travel along the canals in the Valley of Mexico.

General information
The station was opened on 12 August 1991 along the other nine stations of Line A.

As every Line A station, except for Pantitlán, it is an at grade station in the median of Calzada Ignacio Zaragoza with the entrances on both sides of the road connecting to the station through two pedestrian bridges. Due to the design of the station, it has an island platform where passengers can take trains in both eastbound and westbound directions.

It is possible to connect with the bus rapid transit stop of the same name of the Mexico City Metrobús Line 2, which is within walking distance from the metro station.

From 23 April to 25 June 2020, the station was temporarily closed due to the COVID-19 pandemic in Mexico.

Ridership

References

External links
 

Canal De San Juan
Railway stations opened in 1991
1991 establishments in Mexico
Mexico City Metro stations in Iztacalco